Ana Kalandadze (15 December 1924 – 11 March 2008) was a Georgian poet and one of the most influential female figures in modern Georgian literature.

Kalandadze was born in the village Khidistavi near Chokhatauri in Georgia's southwest region of Guria. She graduated from the Faculty of Philology at Tbilisi State University in 1946, and published her first poems the same year. Her intricate, subtle rhythms, and personal lyricism garnered much popularity. In the words of Professor Donald Rayfield:

Many of Kalandadze's poems on patriotic and romantic themes have been made into popular songs. She was also a prolific translator of Russian and European poetry. She died as a result of cerebrovascular incident and was buried at the Mtatsminda Pantheon.

References

External links
 

1924 births
2008 deaths
People from Guria
Women poets from Georgia (country)
Soviet women poets
20th-century poets from Georgia (country)
20th-century women writers from Georgia (country)
20th-century translators
20th-century writers from Georgia (country)
21st-century writers from Georgia (country)
21st-century women writers from Georgia (country)
Tbilisi State University alumni
Burials at Mtatsminda Pantheon